Tadinada Varaprasad popularly known as Nutan Prasad (12 December 1945 – 30 March 2011) was an Indian actor who predominantly worked in Telugu cinema and Telugu theatre. He was a native of Kaikaluru, Andhra Pradesh, India. He started his film acting career in the early 1970s, and has received four state Nandi Awards. He died due to prolonged illness at the age of 65.

Career
In a career spanning over three decades, he acted in about a hundred films in myriad roles ranging from a villain to comedian among others.

Debut and recognition 
Nutan Prasad started his acting career with the play Naa Votu in Guntur. His debut movie was Andala Ramudu, starring along with Akkineni Nageshwara Rao in the year 1973. He continued his acting career with movies like Needaleni Aadadi, and his first major break as an actor with potential came from the movie Muthyala Muggu; he acted as a villain along with Rao Gopal Rao.

His acting career reached its peak with the movie Rajadhi Raju in which he acted as Satan. The movie became a hit and the song choreographed on him "కొత్త దేవుడండీ కొంగొత్త దేవుడండీ", is still popular today. Nutan Prasad costarred with all the generations of heroes. He starred in successful movies like Patnam Vachina Pativratalu, Khaidi, Magamaharaju, Srivariki Premalekha, Kathanayakudu, and Aha Naa Pellanta.

Prasad was known for his dialogues like "దేశం చాలా క్లిష్టపరిస్థితిలో ఉంది" and "నూటొక్క జిల్లాల అందగాడిని". The latter was adapted as a title for the film Nootokka Jillala Andagadu (2021).

After a major accident on the sets of the movie, Bamma Maata Bangaru Baata, he was confined to wheelchair.  He then quit acting in movies fulltime and appeared in guest roles. He also did voiceover and commentary for serials and movies. He dubbed for late Gummadi in Aayanaki Iddaru (1995). Nutan Prasad became the narrator of the hit crime reality show in ETV-2 Neralu Ghoralu. He was appreciated by the Telugu TV audience for his narrative style and voice in Neralu Ghoralu.

Accident during the sets of Bamma Maata Bangaru Baata
In 1989, while shooting for the film Bamma Maata Bangaru Baata, he met with an accident with his costar, Rajendra Prasad and broke his back. The accident left him paralysed from the waist down and was bound to wheelchair.

Death 
He died after prolonged illness at the age of 65 years on 30 March 2011 in Hyderabad.

Awards
Nandi Awards
 Best Supporting Actor–Sundari Subbarao (1984) 
 Best Villain–Praja Swamyam (1987)
 Best Villain–Nava Bharatam (1988)
 Best Supporting Actor–Vasundhara (1992)
 NTR National Award (2005)

Filmography
The partial filmography of Nutan Prasad is :

References

External links
 

1945 births
2011 deaths
Telugu comedians
Indian male film actors
People from Krishna district
Nandi Award winners
Male actors from Andhra Pradesh
Male actors in Telugu cinema
20th-century Indian male actors
21st-century Indian male actors